Embatum or Embaton was a town of ancient Ionia, in the territory of Erythrae, mentioned by Theopompus in the eighth book of his Hellenica. It appears from Thucydides that it was on the coast.

Its site is located near the modern Agrilya, Asiatic Turkey.

References

Populated places in ancient Ionia
Former populated places in Turkey